Liga V is the fifth level of the Romanian football league system.

Current format 
Liga V has 42 divisions. The divisions are regionalised and are organised by every county association. Each team plays in their own county. The county associations decide how many teams play in the league and how many matches each side plays. In Romania the most frequently used system is one division with matches played home and away. A number of associations prefer 2 or even 3 parallel divisions. The number of teams differ from one county association to another.

Promotion 
The champions of each division are promoted to Liga IV.

Notable teams (2022–23)

Liga V

 Arad County
 Național Sebiș
Bihor County
 Ștei
Brașov County
 Colțea Brașov

Dolj County
 Triumf Bârca
Timiș County
 Electrica Timișoara
Vaslui County
 Sporting Vaslui

Liga VI

Arad County
 Gloria Arad

Timiș County
 CFR Timișoara
 Fortuna Becicherecu Mic

Not active at senior level

Brașov County
 Precizia Săcele
Hunedoara County
 CFR Simeria

Prahova County
 Prahova Ploiești
Suceava County
 Pojorâta

Vaslui County
 Hușana Huși

See also 

 Liga I
 Liga II
 Liga III
 Liga IV

References

External links
 Official website 

5
Rom
Professional sports leagues in Romania